The 1999 Copa Merconorte was an association football tournament held in 1999. América de Cali of Colombia beat Santa Fe also of Colombia in the final.

Group stage
Each team played the other teams in the group twice during the group stage. The first place team advanced to the second round.

Group A

Group B

Group C

Semifinals

First Leg

Second Leg

Finals

First Leg

Second Leg

Champion

External links
 1999 Copa Merconorte game summaries
 1999 Copa Merconorte stats

Copa Merconorte
3
América de Cali matches